Promachonas  is a village and a former community in the Serres regional unit, Greece. Since the 2011 local government reform it is part of the municipality Sintiki, of which it is a municipal unit. The municipal unit has an area of 42.212 km2. Population 140 (2011). A major border crossing with Bulgaria is located here. The Bulgarian town opposite Promachonas is Kulata.

History

The village was annexed in 1913 by Greek forces during the Second Balkan War. During the years of Ottoman rule, the village was known by its Bulgarian name Dragotin. After the events of the Greek genocide in Asia Minor, refugees settled in the village. In 1927 the village was renamed Promachonas. Around the village, there are also the villages of Kapnotopos and Rupel. In 1928 the village numbered 463 inhabitants. Before World War II, the village numbered 1,528 inhabitants, but with the beginning of the Greek-Italian War, the village and its other 2 settlements were evacuated. After the liberation of Greece from the Axis and the Greek Civil War, the refugees settled (from the other two settlements) in Promachonas, and thus the village has 245 inhabitants. In the national census of 1961, the village numbered 416 inhabitants.

Promachonas-Topolnica is an important Late Neolithic settlement and cult site that straddles the Greek-Bulgarian border a few kilometers from the community of Promachonas.

Monument

Outside Promachonas, on the Thessaloniki-Promachonas highway, is a monument dedicated to the Byzantine Emperor of the Macedonian dynasty Basil II (Monument of the Battle of the Key). At the top of the monument is placed the symbol of Byzantium, the double-headed eagle, while on the marble column, an inscription has been engraved. The site of the Battle of the Key where Basil II defeated the Bulgarian army in 1014 is now inside Bulgaria.

Transport

Road
Motorway 25 passes through the village, which connects Thessaloniki with Serres and Promachonas.

Rail
There is also the Promachonas railway station that connects the village with Thessaloniki.

References

External links

Populated places in Serres (regional unit)
Bulgaria–Greece border crossings
Neolithic settlements in Macedonia (region)
Neolithic settlements